Antonio de la Torre may refer to:

 Antonio de la Torre (actor) (born 1968), Spanish actor
 Antonio de la Torre (soccer) (born 1977), Mexican-American soccer defender
 Antonio de la Torre Villalpando (1951–2021), Mexican footballer
 Antonio de la Torre (squash player) (born 1992), Guatemalan squash player